Kazimierz Dłuski (1855–1930) was a Polish physician, and social and political activist. He was a member of the Polish Socialist Party. In later life, he was a founder and activist of many non-governmental organizations; he was the founder and first president of the Tatrzańskie Ochotnicze Pogotowie Ratunkowe (Tatras Volunteer Rescue Service).

He married fellow Polish physician Bronisława Skłodowska, an elder sister of Maria Skłodowska-Curie.

See also
 Bolesław Prus:  Dłuski's part in 1878 assault on Prus.

References

1855 births
1930 deaths
People from Vinnytsia Oblast
People from Mogilyovsky Uyezd (Podolian Governorate)
People from the Russian Empire of Polish descent
20th-century Polish physicians
Polish Socialist Party politicians
19th-century Polish physicians